Táliga or Talega is a Spanish town and municipality located near the border with Portugal, in the province of Badajoz, in the Spanish autonomous community of Extremadura. Portugal considers Táliga, as well as neighbouring Olivenza, a de jure part of the Portuguese concelho of Olivenza, occupied by Spain since 1801. (See Olivenza#Claims of sovereignty).

Under Portuguese administration, Táliga was a freguesia (parish) of the concelho (municipality) of Olivenza. It became an independent municipality in 1850, already under Spanish administration.

References

External links

Táliga on the Diputación de Badajoz website

Municipalities in the Province of Badajoz
Territorial disputes of Spain
Territorial disputes of Portugal